The Princess Margaret Cancer Centre (previously, Princess Margaret Hospital) is a scientific research centre and a teaching hospital in Toronto, Ontario, Canada, affiliated with the University of Toronto Faculty of Medicine as part of the University Health Network. The hospital now stands as the largest cancer centre in Canada and one of the five largest cancer centres in the world. Along with the Odette Cancer Centre, which is also associated with University of Toronto Faculty of Medicine and is independently the sixth largest cancer centre in North America, it forms one of the largest cluster of cancer hospitals in the world.

The hospital is situated near the intersection of University Avenue and College Street within the Discovery District of downtown Toronto, an area with high concentration of biomedical research institutions. Named for Princess Margaret, Countess of Snowdon, the hospital is under the royal patronage of Anne, Princess Royal.

The hospital specializes in the treatment of cancer, and offers the majority of its services to residents of the Greater Toronto Area. The hospital offers expertise in the fields of surgical oncology, medical oncology, hematology including bone marrow transplantation, radiation oncology, psychosocial oncology, medical imaging, and radiation therapy.

The hospital houses 17 radiation treatment machines, all of which are equipped with the latest technologies including IMRT and VMAT, a superficial orthovoltage machine, and operates a Gamma Knife (Perfexion) stereotactic radiosurgery machine in collaboration with Toronto Western Hospital.

Education
As a teaching hospital of the University of Toronto, the hospital provides training to various medical professions.  Most notable are clinical programs for medical doctors (medical and radiation oncologists) and radiation therapists.

Research
Its related research arm, the Ontario Cancer Institute (OCI), works in conjunction with the hospital in a mutually beneficial relationship.  Many researchers at the OCI hold appointments at the University of Toronto, often within the Department of Medical Biophysics. The Princess Margaret's research program ranked fourth in terms of the percentage of publications cited in high-impact oncology journals.

History
The hospital was founded as the Ontario Cancer Institute in 1952 by an Act of the Ontario legislature. Designed by the architect Henry Sproatt, it was originally located at 500 Sherbourne Street (now a condo complex) near the former Wellesley Hospital.

During health restructuring legislated by the Harris Government in the late 1990s Princess Margaret Hospital merged with what was then named The Toronto Hospital, which was the entity formed by the previous merger of the Toronto General Hospital and the Toronto Western Hospital, and the new combined organization was named University Health Network (UHN) with the three separate hospitals maintaining their own identities within the new hospital corporation.

The Journey to Conquer Cancer Run or Walk Event
The 7th annual Journey to Conquer Cancer Run or Walk which is organized by the Princess Margaret Cancer Foundation raised $1.7M for charity in 2019 (over $10M since its inception) and takes place annually in May and June with locations in Toronto, Mississauga and Vaughan and offers 5 km, 3 km and 1 km options routed by The Princess Margaret. This event offers teams and individuals the opportunity to raise funds in support of any area of cancer research, clinic, lab or patient care program at the Princess Margaret Cancer Centre.

Additional images

See also
List of Canadian organizations with royal patronage
The Ride to Conquer Cancer

References

External links

 

Hospitals in Toronto
Hospital buildings completed in 1958
Hospital buildings completed in 1995
Organizations based in Canada with royal patronage
Hospitals established in 1952
Cancer hospitals
Hospitals affiliated with the University of Toronto
1952 establishments in Ontario